Zachary Rinaldo (born June 15, 1990) is a former Canadian professional ice hockey left winger. He has previously played in the National Hockey League (NHL) for the Philadelphia Flyers, Boston Bruins, Arizona Coyotes, Nashville Predators and Calgary Flames. He is known for his rough and physical style of play and for being an enforcer.

Playing career
Rinaldo grew up in Hamilton, Ontario, and played his minor AAA hockey for the Hamilton Reps, Cambridge Hawks, Notre Dame Hounds and Hamilton Jr. Bulldogs of the Ontario Minor Hockey Association (OMHA). He is of Italian ancestry.

After his minor midget season with the Jr. Bulldogs, Rinaldo was drafted by the Mississauga St. Michael's Majors of the Ontario Hockey League (OHL) in the 14th round, 270th overall, in 2006.  He spent the following season with the Hamilton Red Wings Jr. A. club in 2006–07 before joining the Majors in 2007–08.

Rinaldo was selected by the Philadelphia Flyers in the sixth round, 178th overall, of the 2008 NHL Entry Draft. After spending another season in the OHL, on August 11, 2009, he signed a three-year, entry-level contract with the Flyers. Rinaldo started the 2010–11 AHL season playing with the Flyers' AHL affiliate, the Adirondack Phantoms.

Rinaldo made his NHL debut on April 22, 2011, in Game 5 of the first round of the 2011 Stanley Cup playoffs against the Buffalo Sabres, despite having more suspensions (4) than goals scored (3) for the Flyers' American Hockey League (AHL) affiliate, the Adirondack Phantoms, in the 2010–11 season. He again made the lineup for Game 1 of the Eastern Conference Semifinals against the Boston Bruins, registering two shots.

At the conclusion of the Flyers' training camp in October 2011, Rinaldo made the Flyers' opening night roster for the 2011–12 season, sharing enforcing duties with veteran Jody Shelley.

On April 17, 2013, Rinaldo signed a two-year, $1.5 million contract extension with Philadelphia.

On January 26, 2015, Rinaldo was suspended eight games for charging Pittsburgh Penguins defenceman Kris Letang; Rinaldo consequently forfeited US$73,170.72 in pay.

Following the 2014–15 season, Rinaldo was traded to the Boston Bruins in exchange for a third-round pick in the 2017 NHL Entry Draft. On March 1, 2016, Rinaldo was suspended by the NHL for five games for an illegal hit delivered to Tampa Bay Lightning forward Cédric Paquette in a game two days earlier. Rinaldo was promptly placed on waivers by the Bruins, which he cleared. It was his fourth suspension in five NHL seasons, and as a repeat offender, he forfeited $51,829.25 in pay.

On March 4, 2016, after being sent down to the Providence Bruins of the AHL, and while his NHL suspension was still tolled, Rinaldo again faced suspension for an incident in a game against the Bridgeport Sound Tigers, his first game after being demoted. Rinaldo received a match penalty for intent to injure for a hit delivered to Bridgeport defenceman Kane Lafranchise. Rinaldo was suspended from the AHL indefinitely. The AHL later announced that Rinaldo would be suspended for five games for a hit targeting the head.

On July 1, 2017, having left the Bruins organization as a free agent after two seasons (and after spending the entire  season in the minors), Rinaldo agreed to a one-year, two-way contract with the Arizona Coyotes. During the 2017–18 season, Rinaldo made his return to the NHL with the Coyotes, playing his first full season since 2015, but not before having to serve the five-game suspension that had been tolled from March 2016. On December 23, 2017, while playing against the Colorado Avalanche, Rinaldo sucker-punched Colorado defenceman Samuel Girard and was suspended for six games.

On July 2, 2018, Rinaldo reunited with former Flyers head coach Peter Laviolette in signing as a free agent to a one-year, two-way contract with the Nashville Predators. Rinaldo made the Predators opening night roster out of training camp, and remained with the team for the majority of the 2018–19 season, posting 1 goal and 3 points in 23 appearances.

As a free agent from the Predators, Rinaldo went un-signed over the summer before accepting an invitation to attend the Calgary Flames training camp. After a successful try-out with the Flames in the pre-season, Rinaldo was signed to a one-year, two-way $700,000 contract with Calgary on September 29, 2019. On October 9, 2020, the opening day of free agency, Rinaldo was re-signed by the Flames to another one-year, two-way $700,000 contract.

On August 13, 2021, Rinaldo signed with the Columbus Blue Jackets on a one-year, two-way $750,000 contract. However, after not receiving the COVID-19 vaccine, Rinaldo was uninvited to the Blue Jackets training camp and told to report to their American Hockey League (AHL) affiliate, the Cleveland Monsters.

Career statistics

References

External links

 

1990 births
Living people
Adirondack Phantoms players
Arizona Coyotes players
Barrie Colts players
Boston Bruins players
Calgary Flames players
Canadian expatriate ice hockey players in the United States
Canadian ice hockey left wingers
Canadian people of Italian descent
Ice hockey people from Ontario
London Knights players
Milwaukee Admirals players
Mississauga St. Michael's Majors players
Nashville Predators players
Philadelphia Flyers draft picks
Philadelphia Flyers players
Providence Bruins players
Sportspeople from Hamilton, Ontario
Stockton Heat players
Toronto St. Michael's Majors players